Giada is a feminine Italian given name meaning "jade".

List of people with the given name Giada
 Giada Ballan, Italian former synchronized swimmer
 Giada Colagrande, Italian film director and actress
 Giada De Laurentiis, Italian American chef, writer and television personality
 Giada Gallina, Italian former sprinter
 Giada Valenti, Italian singer
 Giada Wiltshire, Italian beauty pageant contestant

Other
Giada, Italian fashion brand

References

Italian feminine given names